Ytre Oslofjord (Norwegian literally "Outer Oslo Fjord") is that part of Oslofjord which is south of the threshold of Drøbaksund (literally Drøbak Sound), the strait  where the fjord narrows between Drøbak and Hurum, Norway. Ytre Oslofjord stretches down to Langesund.

External links
Ytre Oslofjord website

Fjords of Vestfold og Telemark
Fjords of Viken